Bala Sang Rizeh (also Romanized as Bālā Sang Rīzeh) is a village in Esfivard-e Shurab Rural District, in the Central District of Sari County, Mazandaran Province, Iran. At the 2006 census, its population was 746, in 179 families.

References 

Populated places in Sari County